The Mukawwar Managed Nature Reserve is found in Sudan. This 300 km² marine reserve surrounds Mukawwar Island off the Red Sea coast of Sudan.

References

Geography of Sudan